is a Japanese pop singer and songwriter. She was one of the three original members and original lead singer of the J-pop band Dream also known as "Dream/DRM".

In July 2002, she left the band to pursue a solo career. She is also known for writing the lyrics to the Japanese version of BoA's debut single, "ID; Peace B".

In 2006, Matsumuro launched a solo career, releasing digital singles.

iTunes songs
 "Destiny / Love-1|Destiny / Love-1" (iTunes exclusive) [2006.06.21]
 "Chiisa na Hikari" (小さな光) [2006.12.27]
 "Feelings '07" [2007.09.19]
 "Existence" [2008.03.19]
 "Koigoromo" (恋衣) [2008.05.07]
 "Dramatic" [2008.06.11]

References

1983 births
Living people
Dream (Japanese group)
Japanese women pop singers
Japanese women singer-songwriters
Japanese singer-songwriters
Japanese lyricists
Japanese pianists
Japanese record producers
People from Nakatsu, Ōita
Musicians from Ōita Prefecture
Japanese women pianists
Japanese women record producers
21st-century Japanese composers
21st-century Japanese pianists
21st-century Japanese singers
21st-century Japanese women singers
21st-century women composers
21st-century women pianists